Eulia is a genus of moths belonging to the subfamily Tortricinae of the family Tortricidae.

Species
Eulia ministrana (Linnaeus, 1758)

See also
List of Tortricidae genera

References

 , 1816, Verz. bekannter Schmett.: 392.
 , 2005, World Catalogue of Insects 5

External links
tortricidae.com

Euliini
Tortricidae genera